Skogshorn, also written Skogshødn, is a mountain in the municipality Hemsedal in the county Viken.

Skogshorn is a part of Hemsedal Top 20.

The summit of Skogshorn is a popular destination for day-trips both summer and winter.  The east-side approach requires no climbing, and is popular for families and other mountain tourists.  The south-side of the mountain can be climbed.

Mountains of Viken